Salim Hassan Abdullah (born 11 February 1963) Known as Mr. White, was a Tanzanian CCM politician and Member of Parliament for Mpendae constituency from 2010 to his death on the 14th of September 2020 aged 57. He was a co-founder and chairman of Turkys Group of Companies, a group which comprises over 14 companies from health, tourism, transportation, food and water, building materials, oil and gas, communication, engineering, cements making, real estates and other businesses. The companies located in Tanzania Mainland, Zanzibar and Comoros Islands, the companies are operated and administered by his two sons Toufiq as Chief Executive Officer and Abdalla as Executive Director while his only daughter Khaitham concentrates in her own fashion and beauty business.

References

1963 births
Living people
Tanzanian Muslims
Chama Cha Mapinduzi MPs
Tanzanian MPs 2010–2015
Tumekuja Secondary School alumni